Hollow Bones is the fifth LP studio album by the American rock band Rival Sons, released on June 10, 2016.

Track listing

The vinyl version contains tracks 1–5 on side A and tracks 6–9 on side B.

Personnel
Rival Sons
Jay Buchanan – vocals
Scott Holiday – guitar, string arrangement
Dave Beste – bass guitar
Michael Miley – drums

Additional musicians
Todd E. Ogren-Brooks – keyboards
Kristen Rogers, Whitney Coleman and April Rucker – backing vocals on "Tied Up" and "Black Coffee"
Eamon McLoughlin – cello, violin

Production
Dave Cobb – production
Matt Ross'Spang – recording engineer (tracks 1–6, 8–9)
Eddie Spear – mixing
Pete Lyman – mastering
John Netti – recording engineer for "Black Coffee"

Additional
Emilia Pare – photography
Martin Wittfooth – album artwork and layout
Luke Martin (at House of David), Mark Esser (at Sixteen Tons Studios) – tracking seconds

Credits adapted from liner notes.

Charts

References

2016 albums
Albums produced by Dave Cobb
Earache Records albums
Rival Sons albums